An unorganized area or unorganized territory is any geographic region in Canada that does not form part of a municipality or Indian reserve. In these areas, the lowest level of government is provincial or territorial.  In some of these areas, local service agencies may have some of the responsibilities that would otherwise be covered by municipalities.

British Columbia
Most regional districts in British Columbia include some electoral areas, which are unincorporated areas that do not have their own municipal government, but residents of such areas still receive a form of local government by electing representatives to their regional district boards.

The Stikine Region in the province's far northwest is the only part of British Columbia not in a regional district, because of its low population and the lack of any incorporated municipalities. The Stikine Region—not to be confused with the Stikine Country or the Kitimat-Stikine Regional District—provides services and regulatory capacities in the same way as regional districts, however, but is managed directly by the provincial government instead of by a regional district board.

Ontario
In Ontario, unorganized areas are found only in the Northern Ontario region, inclusive of the Parry Sound District, the parts of the province where there is no county or regional municipality level of government. Some communities within unorganized areas may have some municipal services administered by local services boards.

Unorganized areas in Ontario are named only by the district of which they are a part, with a geographic qualifier added when a single district contains more than one such area. Three of the province's unorganized areas had no reported population in the Canada 2006 Census; they are marked with †daggers.

 Algoma, UNO, North Part
 †Algoma, UNO, South East Part
 Cochrane, UNO, North Part
 Cochrane, UNO, South East Part
 †Cochrane, UNO, South West Part
 Kenora, UNO
 Manitoulin, UNO, Mainland
 Manitoulin, UNO, West Part
 Nipissing, UNO, North Part
 Nipissing, UNO, South Part
 Parry Sound, UNO, Centre Part
 Parry Sound, UNO, North East Part
 Rainy River, UNO
 Sudbury, UNO, North Part
 Thunder Bay, UNO
 †Timiskaming, UNO, East Part
 Timiskaming, UNO, West Part

Quebec

Unorganized territories (territoires non organisés) in Quebec are located within regional county municipalities. They are usually named for a geographic feature within the unincorporated area.

Manitoba

In Manitoba, territories not part of rural municipalities, urban municipalities (city, town, or village), local government districts, or Indian reserves are classified as "Unorganized". These cover 67.4% of the total area of the province of Manitoba, with Unorganized Division No. 23 constituting more than half of the entire unorganized area of the province. The unorganized areas of Manitoba are labeled to and referred as with the Census division number they are located in, even though census divisions do not serve any administrative purpose.

See also
 Unincorporated area
 Unorganized territory